In group theory, the induced representation is a representation of a group, which is constructed using a known representation of a subgroup .

Induced representations were initially defined by Frobenius, for linear representations of finite groups. The idea is by no means limited to the case of finite groups, but the theory in that case is particularly well-behaved.

Constructions

Algebraic

The induced representation  can be thought of as acting on the following space:

(This is just another way of saying that  is a full set of representatives.)

where  for each i.

Alternatively, one can construct induced representations by extension of scalars: any K-linear representation   of the group H can be viewed as a module V over the group ring K[H]. We can then define

This latter formula can also be used to define  for any group  and subgroup , without requiring any finiteness.

Examples
For any group, the induced representation of the trivial representation of the trivial subgroup is the right regular representation.  More generally the induced representation of the trivial representation of any subgroup is the permutation representation on the cosets of that subgroup.

An induced representation of a one dimensional representation is called a monomial representation, because it can be represented as monomial matrices.  Some groups have the property that all of their irreducible representations are monomial, the so-called monomial groups.

Properties

The universal property of the induced representation, which is also valid for infinite groups, is equivalent to the adjunction asserted in the reciprocity theorem. In other words,  is the unique map making the following diagram commute:

 

Analytic
Let  be a continuous unitary representation of  into a Hilbert space V.  We can then let:

This construction is often modified in various ways to fit the applications needed.  A common version is called normalized induction and usually uses the same notation.  The definition of the representation space is as follows:

With the addition of the normalizing factors this induction functor takes unitary representations to unitary representations.

One other variation on induction is called compact induction.  This is just standard induction restricted to functions with compact support. Formally it is denoted by ind and defined as:

Note that if  is compact then Ind and ind are the same functor.

Geometric
Then   acts on the product   as follows:

Define on    the equivalence relation

Let  be the space of sections  of this vector bundle. This is the vector space underlying the induced representation .

Systems of imprimitivity 
In the case of unitary representations of locally compact groups, the induction construction can be formulated in terms of systems of imprimitivity.

Lie theory 
In Lie theory, an extremely important example is parabolic induction: inducing representations of a reductive group from representations of its parabolic subgroups. This leads, via the philosophy of cusp forms, to the Langlands program.

See also 
Restricted representation
Nonlinear realization
Frobenius character formula

Notes

References 

 
 
 
 
Representation theory of groups
 

Group theory